Jacob Sheinkman (December 6, 1926 – January 29, 2004) was an American labor union leader.

Sheinkman was born in the Bronx, to parents who had recently emigrated from Kyiv.  In his youth, Sheinkman attended Evander Childs High School and was active in the Workmen's Circle.  He served in the US Navy during World War II, then in the Naval Reserve, where he became a lieutenant.  After the war, he studied industrial labor relations at Cornell University, then law, and also completed a certificate in economics with the University of Oxford.

After completing his studies, Sheinkman became an organizer with the International Brotherhood of Pulp, Sulphite and Paper Mill Workers, then in 1953 switched to work for the Amalgamated Clothing Workers of America.  In 1958, he became the union's general counsel, then in 1972, he was elected as its secretary-treasurer.  The union merged into the new Amalgamated Clothing and Textile Workers Union, and Sheinkman continued as secretary-treasurer, then in 1987, he was elected as its president.  As leader of the union, he was prominent in opposition to CIA activities in Nicaragua, and was also known for working with companies in an attempt to persuade them to keep jobs in America.  He also served on the President's Advisory Committee for Trade Policy and Negotiations.

With the textile and clothing industry in decline, Sheinkman arranged a further merger, which in 1995 formed the Union of Needletrades, Industrial and Textile Employees.  He retired, taking the title of president emeritus of the new union, and instead becoming chair of Americans for Democratic Action.

References

1926 births
2004 deaths
Amalgamated Clothing Workers of America people
American labor lawyers
People from the Bronx
Trade unionists from New York (state)
Cornell University alumni
Alumni of the University of Oxford